The Silent Revolution is a 1972 German documentary film about molecular biology. It was nominated for an Academy Award for Best Documentary Feature.

References

External links

1972 films
1972 documentary films
1972 short films
West German films
German short documentary films
German black-and-white films
1970s short documentary films
1970s German films